The 1984–85 Kent Football League season was the 19th in the history of the Kent Football League, a football competition in England.

The league was won by Tunbridge Wells but the club was not promoted to the Southern Football League.

League table

The league featured 15 clubs which competed in the previous season, along with two new clubs:
Greenwich Borough, transferred from the London Spartan League
Metropolitan Police (Hayes)

League table

References

External links

1984-85
1984–85 in English football leagues